St. Andrew's Episcopal School may refer to:

 St. Andrew's Episcopal School (Maryland) in Potomac, Maryland
 St. Andrew's Episcopal School (Mississippi) in Jackson, Mississippi
 St. Andrew's Episcopal School (Amarillo, Texas)
 St. Andrew's Episcopal School (Texas) in Austin, Texas

See also
 St. Andrew's School (disambiguation)